The Thai Ambassador in Paris is the official representative of the Government in Bangkok to the Government of France  and Permanent Representative to the UNESCO.

List of representatives

 France–Thailand relations

References 

 
France
Thailand